John Thomas Richardson, C.M. (December 20, 1923 – March 29, 2022) was an American academic administrator and Catholic priest. He served as the ninth President of DePaul University, serving from 1981 through 1993. He began his academic career with DePaul University in 1954, when he served as the dean of the Graduate School until his election as university president. After his tenure ended, he became the university's chancellor, serving until 2017.

Early life
Richardson was born in Dallas, Texas. His parents were Patrick Richardson and Mary ( Walsh) Richardson. He joined the Congregation of the Mission in 1942. He studied at St. Mary's Seminary in Perryville, Missouri and earned a bachelor's degree in philosophy in 1946. 

Richardson became a priest in 1949 and received his Doctor of Sacred Theology from the Dominican Angelicum University in 1951. He returned to school in 1954, attending St. Louis University to receive a master's degree in sociology.

DePaul University presidency
Richardson began his career with DePaul University in 1954, when he served as the dean of the Graduate School. He also served as a trustee of the university beginning in 1954 until 1993. In 1981, Richardson became the university's 9th president. He was inaugurated at Navy Pier on October 31, 1981 with Illinois Governor James R. Thompson and Chicago Mayor Jane Byrne declaring that week of October 25 to November 1 as DePaul University Week. One of his first actions was to re-establish the university's student paper after his predecessor disbanded it due to negative coverage of his administration.

The Center for Urban Education, International Human Rights Law Institute, and Institute for Business Ethics were all founded during his tenure at the university. His administration also oversaw the university's first satellite campus in Oak Brook, Illinois as better education access for adult and commuter students.

During his tenure, the university constructed three student residence halls in Lincoln Park, to help attract students from out of state. When he retired on June 30, 1993, the university had 16,500 students. His successor, John P. Minogue,was named DePaul University's 10th president in September 1993. After his tenure as president ended, Richardson became the university's chancellor and served in this role until 2017. He was later honored as chancellor emeritus.

Later years and death

After his retirement, Richardson went into academia, teaching various seminarian courses. 

Rich\ardson is the author of the memoir The Playful Hand of God (2011), as well as Readings in Catholic Social Teaching (2015), a collection of lectures and documents from his work at Christ the King Seminary.
 
Richardson died on March 29, 2022, in Perryville, Missouri, aged 98.

Legacy
In 1992, the John R. Richardson Library was opened at DePaul University's Lincoln Park campus.

In 1994, Governor of Illinois Jim Edgar honored Richardson as Laureate in the Order of Lincoln, the highest honor in Illinois for his philanthropy works.

References

External links
 Past Presidents at DePaul University

1923 births
2022 deaths
20th-century American academics
21st-century American academics
American Roman Catholic priests
Educators from Texas
Clergy from Dallas
Writers from Dallas
Pontifical University of Saint Thomas Aquinas alumni
Saint Louis University alumni
St. Mary's Seminary and University alumni